Asthenosoma intermedium is a species of sea urchin of the family Echinothuriidae. Their armour is covered with spines. It is placed in the genus Asthenosoma and lives in the sea. Asthenosoma intermedium was first scientifically described in 1938 by Hubert Lyman Clark.

See also 
 Asthenosoma dilatatum
 Asthenosoma ijimai
 Asthenosoma marisrubis

References 

intermedium
Animals described in 1938